Perry Township is a civil township of Shiawassee County in the U.S. state of Michigan.  The population was 4,327 at the 2010 census.  The township surrounds the city of Perry, but the two are administrated autonomously.  Perry Township was organized in 1841.

Communities
 Forest Green Estates is an unincorporated community in the township, south of Bath Road and north of the railroads from Beardslee Road to the western township border.
 Morrice is a village within the township.

Geography

Demographics
As of the census of 2000, there were 4,438 people, 1,568 households, and 1,221 families residing in the township. The racial makeup of the township was 97.30% White, 0.29% African American, 0.43% Native American, 0.23% Asian, 0.07% Pacific Islander, 0.23% from other races, and 1.46% from two or more races. Hispanic or Latino of any race were 1.28% of the population.

There were 1,568 households, out of which 42.0% had children under the age of 18 living with them, 61.9% were married couples living together, 10.8% had a female householder with no husband present, and 22.1% were non-families. 16.9% of all households were made up of individuals, and 5.5% had someone living alone who was 65 years of age or older.  The average household size was 2.83 and the average family size was 3.16.

In the township the population was spread out, with 30.2% under the age of 18, 8.5% from 18 to 24, 32.2% from 25 to 44, 21.5% from 45 to 64, and 7.6% who were 65 years of age or older.  The median age was 33 years. For every 100 females, there were 96.6 males.  For every 100 females age 18 and over, there were 94.8 males.

The median income for a household in the township was $50,783, and the median income for a family was $56,809. Males had a median income of $41,905 versus $25,885 for females. The per capita income for the township was $20,744.  About 4.9% of families and 5.9% of the population were below the poverty line, including 8.9% of those under age 18 and 5.0% of those age 65 or over.

Highways

References

External links
Municipal government and local Chamber of Commerce
Perry Township official website
Perry-Morrice Chamber of Commerce website

Townships in Shiawassee County, Michigan
Townships in Michigan
Populated places established in 1841
1841 establishments in Michigan